This is a list of marae (Māori meeting grounds) in the Hawke's Bay Region of New Zealand.

In October 2020, the Government committed $9,623,529 from the Provincial Growth Fund to upgrade 51 marae in the region, with the intention of creating 262.5 jobs.

Wairoa District

Hastings District

Napier City

Central Hawke's Bay District

See also
 Lists of marae in New Zealand
 List of schools in the Hawke's Bay Region

References

Hawke's Bay Region, List of marae in the
Marae
Marae in the Hawke's Bay Region, List of